Ancoats and Clayton was an electoral district or ward in the north of the City of Manchester in North West England. The population of this ward at the 2011 census was 16,141. It includes the Ancoats and Clayton districts and part of the Northern Quarter. Under boundary changes by the Local Government Boundary Commission for England (LGBCE) the ward was abolished and replaced with the new electoral wards Ancoats and Beswick, Clayton and Openshaw, and Piccadilly from May 2018.

Governance 
Voters from the ward elected three councillors to Manchester City Council.

Councillors

 indicates seat up for re-election.
 indicates seat won in by-election.
 indicates ward abolished and replaced with Ancoats and Beswick, Clayton and Openshaw and Piccadilly.

References

External links
Ward boundary on MySociety (KML)
manchester.gov.uk
The Ancoats Building Preservation Trust
Ancoats Community Web Site



Manchester City Council Wards